The Wireless Industrial Networking Alliance (WINA) is a coalition of industrial end-user companies, technology suppliers, industry organizations, software developers, system integrators, and others interested in the advancement of wireless solutions for industry.

WINA's primary task is to develop standards organizations to assure their relevance to industrial requirements.

Additionally, WINA offer webinars to help educate the industry on the developing wireless industry.

Technology trade associations
Wireless network organizations